Alex Rowe (born 11 March 1985) is a Malta international rugby league footballer who plays for the Hunslet in the Betfred League 1.

Background
Rowe was born in Lee Green, London, England. He is of Maltese, Dominican, and Jamaican descent.

Career
He has previously played for the London Broncos, Castleford Tigers (Heritage № 836), Sheffield Eagles, Doncaster, and the Batley Bulldogs. Here he attained legend status.

Hunslet RLFC
On 23 Jan 2020 it was announced that Rowe had joined Hunslet RLFC.

References

External links

Sheffield Eagles profile
Rugby star jailed for 'stupid' attack
RUGBY LEAGUE: EX-CASTLEFORD PROP ALEX ROWE WILL MAKE début AGAINST HIS FORMER CLUB
Sheffield Eagles opens the door to loan move for forward Alex Rowe
2016 player statistics

1985 births
Living people
Batley Bulldogs players
Castleford Tigers players
Doncaster R.L.F.C. players
Maltese rugby league players
Malta national rugby league team players
English rugby league players
Maltese people of Jamaican descent
Sportspeople of Jamaican descent
Maltese people of Dominica descent
English sportspeople of Jamaican descent
English people of Dominica descent
Hunslet R.L.F.C. players
London Broncos players
Newcastle Thunder players
Rugby league locks
Rugby league props
Rugby league players from Greater London
Sheffield Eagles players
West Indies national rugby league team players